Pantitlán metro station is a Mexico City Metro transfer station in the boroughs of Iztacalco and Venustiano Carranza, in Mexico City. It is a combined underground, at-grade, and elevated station with six island platforms and two side platforms, served by Lines 1 (the Pink Line), 5 (the Yellow Line), 9 (the Brown Line), and A (the Purple Line). The only quadra-line interchange station in the system, Pantitlán metro station works as the terminal station of all of the lines and is located adjacent to Zaragoza (Line 1), Hangares (Line 5), Puebla (Line 9), and Agrícola Oriental (Line A) stations. It serves the colonias (neighborhoods) of Ampliación Adolfo López Mateos, Aviación Civil, and Pantitlán; it receives its name from the last one. The station's pictogram features the silhouettes of two flagpoles.

Pantitlán metro station opened on 19 December 1981 with service northwestward toward Consulado on Line 5; service eastward toward Observatorio on Line 1 started on 22 August 1984; service eastward toward Centro Médico on Line 9 started on 26 August 1987; and service southeastward toward La Paz on Line A started on 12 August 1991. The facilities are accessible for people with disabilities as there are elevators, access ramps, tactile pavings, and braille signage plates. Inside there is a cultural display, an Internet café, a women's defense module, a public ministry office, a health module, a mural, and a bicycle parking station.

By far, Pantitlán is the busiest station in the system. In 2019, before the impact of the COVID-19 pandemic on public transport, the station had a ridership of 132,845,471 passengers, whereas the second place (Cuatro Caminos station) registered 39,378,128 passengers. Out of those passengers, 45,550,938 entrances were registered on Line A, making it the busiest station when counted separately. Since 11 July 2022, the Line 1 station has remained closed due to modernization works on the tunnel and the line's technical equipment.

Location

Pantitlán is a metro transfer station in the boroughs of Iztacalco and Venustiano Carranza, in eastern Mexico City. The station lies mostly along Río Churubusco Avenue and serves colonias (Mexican Spanish for "neighborhoods") of Ampliación Adolfo López Mateos, Aviación Civil, and Pantitlán. Pantitlán metro station functions as the terminal station of Lines 1, 5, 9, and A, and it is adjacent to Zaragoza (Line 1), Hangares (Line 5), Puebla (Line 9), and Agrícola Oriental (Line A) stations.

The area is serviced by stations of the Metrobús (Line 4), Mexibús (Line III) and trolleybus (Line 2) systems Additional service is provided by Routes 11-B, 11-C, 19-F, and 19-G of the city's public bus system and by Route 168 of the Red de Transporte de Pasajeros network. The station is served by a Centro de transferencia modal (CETRAM), a type of transport hub. As of 2010, over 3,600 transport units, locally known as peseros, were operating in the hub. By 2016, the system estimated that the CETRAM was the most used in the country. Pantitlán is also the closest metro station to the Terminal 2 of the Mexico City International Airport.

Exits
There are eight exits:
West: Miguel Lebrija Avenue and Alberto Braniff Street, Aviación Civil, Venustiano Carranza (Line 1).
North: Alberto Braniff Street, Aviación Civil, Venustiano Carranza (Line 5).
South: Miguel Lebrija Avenue, Aviación Civil, Venustiano Carranza (Line 5).
West: Río Churubusco Avenue, Ampliación Adolfo López Mateos, Venustiano Carranza (Line 9).
East: Miguel Lebrija Avenue and 2ª Cerrada de Río Churubusco, Pantitlán, Iztacalco (Line 9).
North: Río Churubusco Avenue and Talleres Gráficos Street, Ampliación Adolfo López Mateos, Venustiano Carranza (Line A).
Northwest: Río Churubusco Avenue and Guadalupe Victoria Street, Ampliación Adolfo López Mateos, Venustiano Carranza (Line A).
South: Río Churubusco Avenue, Pantitlán, Iztacalco (Line A).

History and construction

The architects were Aurelio Nuño Morales and Isaac Broid. Originally, Line 8 (which runs from downtown Mexico City to Constitución de 1917 station in Iztapalapa) was planned to run from Pantitlán to Indios Verdes station, in Gustavo A. Madero, northern Mexico City. The project was canceled due to potential structural issues it would have caused near the Zócalo zone as it was planned to interchange with Line 2 at Zócalo station.

The station was named after Colonia Pantitlán, whose name means "between flags" in Nahuatl. During the Aztec era, the zone, formerly part of Lake Texcoco, was marked with flagpoles to announce to canoeists that it was dangerous to navigate there due to harsh currents. The station's pictogram features a silhouette of two flagpoles with blank flags. Pantitlán station has an accessible service with elevators (Lines 1 and A), access ramps, escalators (Line 9) and tactile pavings and braille signage plates (Lines 9 and A).

Line 1
The line was built by Ingeniería de Sistemas de Transportes Metropolitano, Electrometro, and Cometro, the last one a subsidiary of Empresas ICA. The Line 1 station opened on 22 August 1984, operating towards Observatorio and connecting Lines 1 and 5. Before it was opened, Zaragoza served as the terminal of Line 1, thus the workshops are found between both stations. The location of the workshop indirectly benefited the operations on the line as it allows the trains to depart every 90 seconds. It is an underground station whose interstation tunnel to Zaragoza measures .

In 2016, the station received renovation work. The station will be closed in 2022 for modernization work on the tunnel and technical equipment of the line.

Line 5
The line was built by Cometro and its first section was opened on 19 December 1981, operating toward Consulado station.

Line 9
The line was built by Cometro and its first section was opened on 26 August 1987, operating toward Centro Médico station. It is an elevated station whose interstation with Puebla measures . Additionally, there is a train shed after the station.

Line A
The line was built by Empresas ICA and it was opened on 12 August 1991, operating towards La Paz station, located in the municipality of the same name of the State of Mexico. It is the line's only underground station as the trains pass below the Line 5 tracks. As it incorporates Calzada Ignacio Zaragoza Avenue, the line emerges to the street level.

To build the station, ICA constructed a false rectangular-shaped tunnel using the Milan method. They added floor slabs and the ceiling is made up of prefabricated slabs. Above the ceiling, they added pavement wherever it was required.

From its opening until 12 December 2013, users coming from Line A had to make a double payment to access the other lines and vice versa.

Landmarks

Inside the station, there is a cultural display, an Internet café, a women's defense module, and a health module. Outside the station, a public ministry office was installed in 2002 to reduce criminal offenses inside the station. On 1 May 2007, the system inaugurated the mural Alegoría a la Ciudad de México y el Sistema de Transporte Colectivo, painted by José Luis Elías Jáuregui. According to him, he was inspired by the history of the country and decided to include multiple elements that represent it, including the Popocatépetl and Iztaccíhuatl volcanoes, an eagle devouring a snake (a reference to the country's coat of arms), a pyramid, and a Mestiza holding a white dove. In 2014, the Government of Mexico City built a bicycle parking station near the CETRAM.

Incidents
Sinking reports exists since at least 1998. By 2016, the system informed about the existence of cracks and subsidence that would take about five years to be resolved. After the collapse of the elevated railway near Olivos station on Line 12 in May 2021, users reported the structural damage to other elevated stations, including Pantitlán station. Mayor of Mexico City, Claudia Sheinbaum, said that the reports would be examined accordingly. As of February 2023, authorities had reinforced Line 9's overpass with metallic supports.

From 1 to 16 March 2020, Pantitlán, Hangares and Terminal Aérea stations on Line 5 were closed due to a leak of gasoline in a surface petrol station. The Line 9 station was closed from 27 March to 7 April 2021 due to repairs on the section between Velódromo and Ciudad Deportiva. Platforms M, N, O, P, Q, R, S, and T at the CETRAM were closed on 11 October 2021 due to structural failures detected in the station's basement, which is used to house out-of-service trains.

On 26 January 2022, a man threatened to jump from one of the station's line-connecting bridges. The fall caused the officer to suffer severe head trauma, while the other man resulted unhurt.

Ridership

According to the data provided by the authorities since the 2000s, all the stations have been among the busiest stations of the system's 195 stations. In 2019, before the impact of the COVID-19 pandemic on public transport, the station's ridership totaled 132,845,471 passengers (363,960 passengers per day), whereas the second place (Cuatro Caminos) registered 39,378,128 passengers.

For Line 1, the ridership was 17,860,457 passengers (48,932 per day), which was an increase of 1,874,257 passengers compared to 2018. For Line 5, the station had a ridership of 36,594,748 passengers (100,259 per day), which was a decrease of 716,435 passengers compared to the previous year. For Line 9, the ridership was 32,839,328 passengers (89,970 per day), which was an increase of 1,060,592 passengers compared to 2018. For Line A, the station had a ridership of 45,550,938 passengers (124,797 per day), which was an increase of 4,700,613 passengers compared to the previous year.

In 2019, when counted separately, the Line 1 station was the 17th busiest of the system and the line's 5th busiest. The Line 5 station was the 4th busiest in the system and the line's most used. The Line 9 station was the 5th busiest in the system and it was also the line's busiest. And the Line A station was the busiest in the network, a feat that has occurred from 2017 to 2021.

As of 2010, around 789,000 commuters transited through the station daily. In the same year, it was estimated that 65 percent of the users came from the State of Mexico. By 2019, user traffic was approaching 100,000 passengers per hour (between 6 and 10 a.m.). In 2019, the system announced measures to distribute passengers to reduce accidents and that there are plans to conclude the construction of a ring connecting the four stations.

Notes

References

External links

1981 establishments in Mexico
1984 establishments in Mexico
1987 establishments in Mexico
1991 establishments in Mexico
Accessible Mexico City Metro stations
Mexico City Metro Line 1 stations
Mexico City Metro Line 5 stations
Mexico City Metro Line 9 stations
Mexico City Metro Line A stations
Mexico City Metro stations in Iztacalco
Mexico City Metro stations in Venustiano Carranza, Mexico City
Railway stations located underground in Mexico
Railway stations opened in 1981
Railway stations opened in 1984
Railway stations opened in 1987
Railway stations opened in 1991